Atrypanius implexus is a species of longhorn beetles of the subfamily Lamiinae. It was described by Wilhelm Ferdinand Erichson in 1847, and is known from Mexico to Panama, Ecuador, Brazil, French Guiana, and Bolivia.

References

Beetles described in 1847
Beetles of South America
Arthropods of Colombia
Acanthocinini